Fire Station No. 5 may refer to:

 Fire Station No. 5 (Mobile, Alabama), listed on the National Register of Historic Places (NRHP)
Fire Barn 5 (Elgin, Illinois), NRHP-listed, also known as "Fire Station 5"
No. 5 Fire Station (Sandusky, Ohio), NRHP-listed
 Fire Station No. 5 (Knoxville, Tennessee), NRHP-listed
 Fire Station No. 5 (Roanoke, Virginia)
 Fire Station No. 5 (Tacoma, Washington), NRHP-listed

See also
List of fire stations